KYPCK (Volapuk rendition from Russian "Курск", "Kursk" in the Western Alphabet) is a Finnish metal band. They were formed in 2007 and sing in Russian.

History 
The band's vocalist Erkki Seppänen speaks fluent Russian after his years at Oxford University and working in the Finnish embassy in Moscow. The other members of the band are ex-Sentenced members Sami Lopakka (guitar) and Sami Kukkohovi, bassist Jaakko Ylä-Rautio and drummer Antti Karihtala. KYPCK's debut album Cherno ("Black") was released in 2008, their second album Nizhe ("Lower") in 2011, their third album Imena na Stene ("The Names on the Wall") in 2014, and their fourth album Zero in 2016.

KYPCK's distinctive live performances have included Soviet Era video projections and peculiar instruments like bassist Ylä-Rautio's one-stringed bass Kypcklop, and guitarist Lopakka's six-stringer, built by Amfisound Guitars, around a genuine Kalashnikov AK-47 assault rifle.

KYPCK have created their own genre called "Doomsday Metal" and have broken numerous barriers on their way: The first album sang entirely in the Russian language to have been released worldwide. The lengthiest Russian tour ever by a Western band – from St. Petersburg to Siberia's Irkutsk. Songs on the playlist of Russia's biggest rock radio station, who have strictly ruled out including non-Russian bands in their playlist rotation. In 2015, the band was banned from entering Belarus. In February 2018, the band played a concert in Minsk, Belarus.

All of KYPCK's albums include Cyrillic Russian lyrics and English translations in the booklet of the album.

Members 

Current members
E. Seppänen – vocals (2007–present)
S.S. Lopakka – Lopashnikov six-string instruments (guitars) (2007–present)
S. Kukkohovi – six-string instruments (guitars) (touring 2008–2011), (2011–present)
J.T. Ylä-Rautio – one-string instruments (one-string bass guitar) (2007–present)
A.K. Karihtala – batteria (drums) (2011–present)

Former members
K.H.M. Hiilesmaa – batteria (drums) (2007–2011)

Discography

Studio albums 
 Cherno ("Black") (2008)
 Nizhe ("Lower") (2011)
 Imena na Stene ("The Names on the Wall") (2014)
 Zero (2016)

Singles 
 1917 (2008)
 Imya na Stene ("The Name on the Wall", 2014)
 All About Us (t.A.T.u. cover) (2016)

Videography 
 1917 (2008)
 Stalingrad (2009)
 Alleya Stalina ("The Alley of Stalin", 2011)
 Imya na Stene ("The Name on the Wall", 2014)
 Deti Birkenau ("The Children of Birkenau", 2014)
 Ya svoboden ("I Am Free", 2016)

References

External links 

 Official website
 

Finnish doom metal musical groups
Musical groups established in 2007
Musical quintets